The Bulgarian Orthodox Church – Alternative synod was an Eastern Orthodox Church that claimed to be the sole legitimate Orthodox Church in Bulgaria, between 1992 and 2015.

History
In 1991 the new Bulgarian government created a Board of Religious Affairs that began to initiate reforms in the country’s religious institutions. In March 1992 it ruled that the 1971 election of Bulgarian Patriarch Maxim had been recognized illegal because he had been appointed by the communist government in an uncanonical manner. This triggered a division among the bishops, and several of them under the leadership of Metropolitan Pimen (Enev) of Nevrokop called publicly for Maxim’s deposition, forming the Alternative synod. They were condemned as schismatics by the official Holy Synod of the Bulgarian Orthodox Church. The dispute hardened into an even deeper division when, on July 4, 1996, Metropolitan Pimen was installed as rival Patriarch and was anathematized by Maxim’s Holy Synod.

When Petar Stoyanov was sworn in as Bulgarian President in January 1997, Pimen conducted a blessing ceremony, and in March 1997 the Supreme Administrative Court ruled that the registration of Maxim’s Holy Synod was invalid. In January 1998 President Stoyanov called upon both Patriarchs to resign to provide for the election of a single successor that would end the schism.

In 1998, through mediation of several Eastern Orthodox Churches, an agreement to heal the schism was reached, but soon it turned out that effort for reconciliation were short-lived. Patriarch Pimen died in 1999, and Metropolitan Inokentii (Petrov) was elected new head of the Alternative synod, but without the title of patriarch. In December 2002 a new Bulgarian law on religion marginalized and started to persecute the Alternative Synod. Eventually the Bulgarian authorities decided to intervene. On the night of July 20–21, 2004, priests of the Alternative Synod that opposed Patriarch Maxim’s leadership were forcibly evicted from approximately 250 churches and other properties that the Holy Synod claimed they were illegally occupying. In the immediate aftermath of the operation, clerics from the Alternative Synod held religious services outside of the churches from which they had been evicted.

A synod was held in 2008 for the election of the new head of the Church, and Metropolitan Inokentii was elected as the leading hierarch. In 2010, Metropolitan Inokentii called for a healing of division between the churches.

Patriarch Neofit, elected official Patriarch on 24 February 2013, has been recognised as being influential and for his perseverance in ending the schism.

References

Sources
 
 Legislationline: Case of Holy Synod of the Bulgarian Orthodox Church (Metropolitan Inokentiy) and Others v. Bulgaria

External links
 Orthodoxy Cognate Page (2009): Bulgarian President hopes for Patriarch’s Kirill support in struggle against schismatics
 Orthodoxy Cognate Page (2010): Bulgaria Snubs ECHR Ruling in Favor of Alternative Orthodox Church
 Orthodox History (2018): The Pan-Orthodox Council of 1998

Eastern Orthodox Church bodies in Europe

Eastern Orthodoxy in Bulgaria
Independent Eastern Orthodox denominations